Patrick Martin may refer to:
Alex Shelley (born 1983), American professional wrestler born Patrick Martin
Pat Martin (born 1955), Canadian politician
Pat Martin (baseball) (1894–1949), American Major League Baseball player
Patrick M. Martin (1924–1968), U.S. Representative from California
Patrick Martin (Irish politician) (1830–1895), Irish Member of Parliament in the British House of Commons
Patrick Martin (bobsleigh) (1923–1987), American Olympic bobsledder
Pat Martin (broadcaster), American broadcaster
Patrick S. Martin, West Virginia politician